The Alternative National Congress (ANC) is a political party in Liberia.

History
The ANC was established on 17 August 2013, after registering with the National Electoral Commission. The party won a single seat in the 2014 Senate elections, with Daniel Naatehn Sr winning in Gbarpolu County.

References

External links
Official website

Political parties in Liberia
Political parties established in 2013
2013 establishments in Liberia